The 2016 Rattlesnake 400 was the 7th stock car race of the 2016 NASCAR Camping World Truck Series, and the 20th iteration of the event. The race was held on Friday, June 10, 2016, in Fort Worth, Texas, at Texas Motor Speedway, a 1.5-mile (2.4 km) permanent tri-oval shaped racetrack. The race took the scheduled 167 laps to complete. In an exciting battle for the win, William Byron, driving for Kyle Busch Motorsports, would pass Matt Crafton for the lead with 5 laps to go, and hold off the rest of the field to earn his second career NASCAR Camping World Truck Series win. Crafton dominated the entire race, leading 133 of 167 laps. To fill out the podium, Johnny Sauter, driving for GMS Racing, would finish in 3rd, respectively.

Background 

Texas Motor Speedway is a speedway located in the northernmost portion of the U.S. city of Fort Worth, Texas – the portion located in Denton County, Texas. The reconfigured track measures  with banked 20° in turns 1 and 2 and banked 24° in turns 3 and 4. Texas Motor Speedway is a quad-oval design, where the front straightaway juts outward slightly. The track layout is similar to Atlanta Motor Speedway and Charlotte Motor Speedway. The track is owned by Speedway Motorsports, Inc. Nicknamed “The Great American Speedway“ the racetrack facility is one of the largest motorsports venues in the world capable of hosting crowds in excess of 200,000 spectators.

Entry list 

 (R) denotes rookie driver.
 (i) denotes driver who is ineligible for series driver points.

Track schedule change 
In the early morning of June 9, a plane carrying NASCAR officials and representatives was forced to land shortly after taking off at the Concord Regional Airport, due to mechanical issues. Because of this, the truck series garage would postpone its opening until 3:30 pm CST, the time in which the first practice session would take place. Due to the schedule change, one of the three practice sessions would be cancelled, and the rest of the two would be postponed at a later time.

Practice

First practice 
The first practice session was held on Thursday, June 9, at 6:00 pm CST, and would last for 45 minutes.

Final practice 
The final practice session was held on Thursday, June 9, at 7:30 pm CST, and would last for 1 hour and 30 minutes.

Qualifying 
Qualifying was held on Friday, June 10, at 5:00 pm CST. Since Texas Motor Speedway is at least 1.5 miles (2.4 km) in length, the qualifying system was a single car, single lap, two round system where in the first round, everyone would set a time to determine positions 13–32. Then, the fastest 12 qualifiers would move on to the second round to determine positions 1–12.

Norm Benning and Jennifer Jo Cobb would fail to qualify.

Full qualifying results

Race results

Standings after the race 

Drivers' Championship standings

Note: Only the first 8 positions are included for the driver standings.

References 

NASCAR races at Texas Motor Speedway
June 2016 sports events in the United States
2016 in sports in Texas